Land survey may refer to:

 Topographic surveying and mapping, the survey of landscape features for general mapping purposes
 Civil engineering surveying, a survey of local topographic features for engineering purposes
 Cadastral surveying, the surveying of specific land parcels to define ownership

See also 
 Surveying, which outlines techniques and principles of land survey
 Cartography, the process by which land survey information is used to create maps
 Geodesy
 Public Land Survey System, the method of determining township boundaries in the USA
 Construction engineering, a primary use of Land Survey products